Xanthichthys caeruleolineatus, the outrigger triggerfish is a species of triggerfish from the Indo-West Pacific. It occasionally makes its way into the aquarium trade.

References

 

Balistidae
Taxa named by John Ernest Randall
Taxa named by Keiichi Matsuura
Fish described in 1978